Count Stanisław Antoni Potocki (1837–1884) was a Polish nobleman (szlachcic) and landowner.

Stanisław was owner of Rymanów-Zdrój and Olszyce estates. He married Anna Zofia Działyńska on 7 February 1866 in Kórnik. They had several children together: Jan Nepomucen Potocki, Józef Marian Potocki, Piotr Potocki, Piotr II Potocki, Maria Potocka, Paweł Potocki, Cecylia Maria Potocka, Dominik Potocki and Antoni Tytus Potocki.

1837 births
1884 deaths
Counts of Poland
Stanislaw Antoni